Brachythecium salebrosum is a species of moss in the Brachytheciaceae family. It is widely distributed throughout the world, except for in South-America and in tropical regions.

Brachythecium salebrosum is known to be able to use artificial light to grow in places which are otherwise devoid of natural light, such as Crystal Cave in Wisconsin.

References 

Hypnales